Vigie Beach is located 2 km north of Castries District, Saint Lucia, running parallel and immediately adjacent to the George F. L. Charles Airport.

It is a protected white sand beach. Immediately opposite the airport departure lounge are a few small food kiosks.

The following locations are nearby:
George F. L. Charles Airport, 
Vigie Beach, 
Vigie Lighthouse, 
Vigie Poiint, 
Vigie village,

References

Beaches of Saint Lucia
Castries